Ludwig Emilio Buale Coka (born 26 November 1972) is an Equatoguinean-born Spanish actor, known internationally for his role as Baharat in the science fiction-horror movie The Platform (2019).

Early life and career

Born in Equatorial Guinea of Bubi descent, Buale moved to Spain, with his parents and brothers, when he was six years old. He had no intention of becoming an actor until one day, in 1995, when casting director Paco Pino discovered him as they both waited in a subway station in Madrid. Pino needed a black actor to play Ombasi, one of the main characters of Imanol Uribe'''s Bwana (1996). Before that, Emilio was studying to become a construction engineer, as well as working as a fireman. He accepted Pino's offer traveling to Almería two weeks later for the filming of the movie. Buale made his debut, along with two well-known Spanish actors Andrés Pajares and María Barranco.

Buale continued getting work in films, TV series and, especially, in theatre. He was a member of the National Classical Theater Company of Spain for a couple of years appearing in many of stage productions such as "La entretenida", "Amar después de la muerte", "Los chicos de la banda" and "Yonquis y Yanquis".

Personal life

Buale is a polyglot, being fluent in Spanish, English, French and Bube. He continues to work as a fireman in Madrid. In fact, he has played a fireman in a few TV series and films:
 "Código fuego" (2003)
 Semen, una historia de amor (2005)
 and an episode of the third season of "La que se avecina" (2007)

FilmsBwana - 1996Adiós con el corazón - 2000Mi hijo Arturo - 2000Salvajes - 2001 - 2003Semen, una historia de amor - 2005Hienas - 2009The Platform (El Hoyo)'' - 2019

Short films

Cien maneras de hacer el pollo al txilindrón (1997) by Kepa Sojo
Feliz Navidad (1998) by Óscar del Caz
Impotencia (2002) by Andoni de Carlos
Así fue mi sueño (2003) by Javier Albalá
¿Y tú qué harías (2003) by Emiliano Melgarejo
El niño que jugaba con los trenes (2004) by Jorge Blas
Chantal Lis (2004) by Rut Susa and Maria Pavon
Cara Sucia (2004) by Santiago Zannou
Salomón (2007) by Ignacio Lasierra
Cíclope (2009) by Carlos Morett

Television

Tío Willy (1998) by Eduardo Ladrón de Guevara
Médico de Familia (1998) by Daniel Écija
Mediterráneo (1999) by Antonio Hernández
Pratos combinados (2000) by Chema Fernández
Arrayán (2001) by Eva Bermúdez de Castro, Jaime D. Triviño y Santiago Pumarola
Código fuego (2003) by Miguel Ángel Díez y Eva Lesmes
Hospital Central (2005) by José Mª Caro y Carlos Gil
Los Serrano (2007) by Daniel Écija
El comisario (2008) by Ignacio del Moral
Cazadores de Hombres (2008) by Joan Barbero, Verónica Fernández and Aitor Gabilondo
La que se avecina (2009) by Alberto Caballero, Laura Caballero, Daniel Deorador
Amar en tiempos revueltos (2009) by Rodolfo Sirera
Sin tetas no hay paraíso (2009)
 La fuga (2012)

References

External links
National Classical Theater Company of Spain (Compañía Nacional de Teatro Clásico- en Español)

1972 births
Living people
Equatoguinean emigrants to Spain
Naturalised citizens of Spain
Spanish male film actors
Spanish people of Bubi descent
Equatoguinean film actors
Equatoguinean musical theatre actors
Bubi people